Gideon Samson (born 17 February 1985) is a Dutch writer of children's literature.

Career 

Samson made his debut as writer with the book Niks zeggen!. He received the Vlag en Wimpel award for this book in 2008. In March 2009, he published the book Ziek and he won the Zilveren Griffel award for this book, making him the youngest winner of this award. He also won the Vlag en Wimpel award in 2017 for the book Eilanddagen and in 2018 for the book Alle dieren drijven.

In 2019, he won three awards for his book Zeb.: the Zilveren Griffel, Gouden Griffel and the Nienke van Hichtum-prijs. His books have been published by the publisher Leopold.

Awards 

 2008: Vlag en Wimpel, Niks zeggen!
 2010: Zilveren Griffel, Ziek
 2013: Zilveren Griffel, Zwarte zwaan
 2017: Vlag en Wimpel, Eilanddagen
 2018: Vlag en Wimpel, Alle dieren drijven
 2019: Zilveren Griffel, Zeb.
 2019: Gouden Griffel, Zeb.
 2019: Nienke van Hichtum-prijs, Zeb.

References

External links 

 Gideon Samson (in Dutch), Digital Library for Dutch Literature
 Gideon Samson (in Dutch), jeugdliteratuur.org

1985 births
Living people
Dutch children's writers
21st-century Dutch male writers
Nienke van Hichtum Prize winners
Gouden Griffel winners
Writers from The Hague